John Moore (June 27, 1835 – July 30, 1901) was an Irish-born prelate of the Roman Catholic Church.  He served as the second bishop of the Diocese of St. Augustine in Florida from 1877 to 1901.

Biography

Early life 
John Moore was born in Castletown, County Westmeath, in Ireland on June 27, 1835. His family immigrated to Charleston, South Carolina when he was age 14. Moore attended the seminary in Charleston.  He was sent to Europe to study at the College of Cambrai in Cambrai, France.  Moore then studied theology at the College of Propaganda in Rome. 

Moore was ordained into the priesthood by Archbishop Antonio Ligi-Bussi in Rome on April 9, 1860, for the Diocese of Charleston.  After his ordination, Moore returned to Charleston to assume assignments in parishes.

Bishop of St. Augustine 
On February 16, 1877, Moore was appointed by Pope Pius IX as bishop of the Diocese of St. Augustine. He was consecrated on May 13, 1877, by Bishop Patrick Lynch at St John Baptist Pro-Cathedral in Charleston.  At this time, the diocese covered the entire State of Florida.

A contingent of Benedictine monks arrived in San Antonio, Florida, in 1886 initially to serve German immigrants. In 1887, a yellow fever outbreak in Florida killed several priests in the diocese. That same year, a fire destroyed the Cathedral of St. Augustine. At Moore's request, a group of Jesuit fathers arrived in Tampa, Florida, in 1888 to replace the priests lost to illness.

In August 1888, the St. Mary's Home for Orphan Girls was opened in Jacksonville, Florida.  That same year, yellow fever broke out again in Jacksonville.  With the local priest William J. Kenny sidelined by the disease, Moore rushed there to run the parish and tend to the sick.

In 1889, Moore asked the Benedictines to establish several mission churches on the Florida Gulf Coast from Pasco County northward.  He requested that the Jesuits cover Hillsborough County southward to Key West.

Death and legacy 
During the late 1890s, Moore suffered a stroke that left him debilitated.  John Moore died at his home in St. Augustine on July 30, 1901.Bishop Moore High School in Orlando, Florida, is named for him.

References

External links
St. Augustine Bishops

Episcopal succession

1835 births
1901 deaths
People from County Westmeath
Irish emigrants to the United States (before 1923)
Roman Catholic Diocese of Charleston
Roman Catholic bishops of Saint Augustine
19th-century Roman Catholic bishops in the United States
20th-century Roman Catholic bishops in the United States
Religious leaders from South Carolina